Manitoba Electrical Museum and Education Centre is a museum in Winnipeg, Manitoba, dedicated to the electrical history of Manitoba. It is a volunteer-run organization housed in a converted electrical substation building.

The Museum is affiliated with: CMA,  CHIN, and Virtual Museum of Canada.

Collection
The museum follows the history through six themes from the 1870s to the present, and looks into the future. On the lower level, hands-on safety activities and seasonal displays are featured. Electricity and electrical safety movies can be shown in the orientation room on the lower level, as well as a collection of vintage Gas Genies. A turbine runner is on permanent display at the Manitoba Electrical Museum.

References

External links
Electrical museum Website

Museums in Winnipeg
Technology museums in Canada
Science museums in Canada

River Heights, Winnipeg
Science and technology in Manitoba